Black sky or variation, may refer to:

 night sky, when the sky is black instead of blue
 outer space, whose sky is black instead of blue
 Black Sky, a 1951 Spanish drama film
 Black Sky: The Race For Space (2004), a Peabody Award winning Discovery Channel documentary telefilm about the Ansari X-Prize and SpaceShipOne
 BlackSky, a division of Spaceflight Industries Inc. providing geospatial intelligence services

See also
 The Sky So Big and Black (2002 novel), science fiction novel by John Barnes
 Big Black Sky (2008 album) by Canadian rock band Prism
 Blackened Sky (2004 album), debut studio album by Scottish rock band Biffy Clyro
 Total eclipse, when the sky turns black
 Overcast, or grey sky; heavy overcast from clouds, smoke, dust or sand, can turn the sky black
 Blue Sky (disambiguation)
 Big Sky (disambiguation)
 Black (disambiguation)
 Sky (disambiguation)